David J. Fagg (born c. 1936) is a former American football coach. He served two stints as the head football coach at Davidson College in Davidson, North Carolina, from 1970 to 1973 and 1990 to 1992, compiling a record of 22–45–1. In between his two tenures at Davidson, Fagg was an assistant coach at Georgia Tech, the University of Hawaii, the University of South Carolina, and the University of Arizona.

Fagg attended Davidson, where he was captain of the football and wrestling teams. He later earned a master's degree from Boston University. Fagg began his coaching career in 1962 as head wrestling coach and assistant football coach at Garinger High School in Charlotte, North Carolina. In 1964, he moved on to The Citadel in Charleston, South Carolina to serve in the same two roles for a year. Fagg returned to Davidson in 1965 when he was hired as an assistant on the staff of Homer Smith, who was newly hired as head football coach.

Head coaching record

College football

References

Year of birth missing (living people)
1930s births
Living people
Arizona Wildcats football coaches
Davidson Wildcats football coaches
Davidson Wildcats football players
Davidson Wildcats wrestlers
Georgia Tech Yellow Jackets football coaches
Hawaii Rainbow Warriors football coaches
South Carolina Gamecocks football coaches
The Citadel Bulldogs football coaches
The Citadel Bulldogs wrestling coaches
High school football coaches in North Carolina
High school wrestling coaches in the United States
Boston University alumni
Sportspeople from High Point, North Carolina
Coaches of American football from North Carolina
Players of American football from North Carolina